Yoo Youngkuk (also known as YYK) was a pioneer of Korean abstract art and Korean modern art in general. He began abstract art in the 1930s when he was a student at the Bunka Gakuin art school in Tokyo. Interacting with avant-garde artists and participating actively in Jiyu-ten (Free artist's exhibition) and other societies, YYK was at the mainstream of Japanese modern art movement. After the liberation of Korea, YYK led Korean abstract art as the founder of Neo Realism Group and Association of Modern Artists (AMA) along with Whanki Kim, Lee Kyusang, Han Mook, Hwang Yumsu and Park Kosuk. Mountain was his favorite motif and he earned the reputation as "the painter of mountains." Often he was admirably called as "the magician of colors" because of the bold usage of vibrant colors in his paintings. In his paintings, nature is presented in non-figurative forms using strong lines and colorful planes, and elements of the painting; vibrant colors, metaphysical patterns, and well-planned structural composition are all integrated into a whole that shows the sublimity and solemnity of nature and even makes one to feel the absolute beauty. He had been a member of Korean Academy of Arts since 1979, and he persistently pursued his unique art world and strong work ethic as an artist.

Early life
YYK was born in Uljin County in the mountainous Gangwon province in 1916. He was from a relatively well-to-do family and his father Yoo Moonjong(–1946) was a landlord who provided substantial military provisions to general Shin Dolsuk at the end of the Korean Empire(1906) and established Jedong Elementary School (1922–1943) at Uljin. After the elementary education at Uljin, YYK moved to Seoul to enter Chei Kobo(The Second High School, currently Kyungbok Middle and High School). Under the Japanese occupation, Korean students were highly disciplined and keenly watched for misdemeanors by Japanese teachers and YYK was not an exception. However, Sato Kunio, the art teacher at Chei Kobo earned much respect from Korean students because of his open- minded and liberal personality, and it was his influence that the school produced many masters in Korean modern art. Student beating was not uncommon those days. On one occasion YYK was beaten by his teacher over refusing to spy fellow students, and he became more disenchanted with the repressive atmosphere of the school. Days after, he quit the school even though he was on his graduation year and went to Japan with the intention of entering a merchant marine academy at Yokohama to become an officer of the commercial cargo ship travelling the world. After realizing that high school diploma was required to apply for the school, he decided to enter the oil-painting department of the Bunka Gakuin College in Tokyo, an art school known for her liberal atmosphere and policies.

Tokyo Period (1935–1943)
The avant-garde movement of Japan started in the 1920s and by the time YYK arrived at Tokyo Russian futurism and constructivism were already widely permeated to the Japanese art scenes. Hasegawa Saburo and Murai Masanari who had studied abroad in Paris were leading Japanese avant-garde movement after their returning to Tokyo.

Abstract Art
At Bunka Gakuin YYK decided to major in abstract painting even though there was no professor who could teach abstract art. However, he determined to study something completely different from the traditional painting, so he pursued his way to abstract art on his own. YYK made his debut as an artist at the 7th exhibition of Independent Artists Association in 1937 and participated in Jiyu-ten by the association of free artists from the beginning, and won the grand prize at the second exhibition(1938) and became a fellow of the society. It was the prize that made him to participate in the mainstream of the Japanese avant-garde movement. Unfortunately, his works during this period were all lost during the Korean War except some of his relief works remaining in the form of postcards later reproduced by his daughter Yoo Lizzy(1945-2013), a metal craft artist herself. Those original reliefs were made in the late 1930s almost at the same time with Piet Mondrian and Jean Arp who led the Abstraction-Création group in Paris, showing that YYK was keenly aware of the artistic movements around the world and participated in the cutting-edge movement.

Photography
YYK learned photography at Oriental Photography School in Tokyo and his photo works were exhibited at the Jiyu-ten. During the outbreak of the World War II, artists were forced to work on documentary war paintings in Japan and an artist such as Hasegawa Saburo, unwilling to comply with the policy, chose to work on photography. This might have affected YYK to some degree, but he later recollected that he learned photography as a means of living for the future. His photo works portrayed mostly historical remains of Gyengju the old capital of Silla (B.C.57–A.D.935).

The Blank Period (1943–1955)
As the WW II neared to its end, YYK came back to Korea (1943) and married Kim Kisoon the following year. During the chaotic period of Korea to be liberated from the Japanese empire (1945) and to become an independent country, YYK captained a fishing boat owned by the family with about ten men crew and went out to the sea for fishing for years. In 1947, he was offered a job to work as a full-time instructor at the fine art department of the Seoul National University and moved to Seoul to resume his career as a (fine) artist.

Sinsasil-pa( Neo realism Group)
With Kim Whanki and Lee Kyusang, YYK started Sinsasil-pa and held the 1st exhibition at the Hwashin department store gallery in Seoul (1948), and the group activity continued till 1953 (the 3rd exhibition was held at Busan due to the breakout of Korean War in 1950). Even though the group was quite small in size, all the group members were experienced artists in Tokyo and their vision and manifesto left lasting impact on the Korean art circle. YYK was a key figure in establishing the character of Sinsasil-pa and also leading figure in overall Korean art scenes from the late ‘50s to the early '60s in contextualizing and fixating modern art in Korea. Nature, and to be more specific mountains, began to appear as the motif of his work.

Korean War: The Dark Period
During the first three months when Seoul was occupied by the North Korean Army (June 28-Sep 28, 1950) and the following several months after the liberation of Seoul, YYK and his family had to endure extreme hunger and poverty. On the brink of the second occupation of Seoul by the North Korean Army in January 1951, YYK and his family escaped to his hometown, Uljin, but the economic situation was no better. There, YYK took over the brewery factory and a fishing boat of the family that were not operating for years and worked as an entrepreneur as well as a laborer. With good business skills and almost fierce efforts, YYK became one of the most prosperous men of the town within few years. However, YYK quitted the business at the peak of financial success and moved up to Seoul to paint again.

During the ages between late twenties to early forties, YYK was out of his profession just to survive and support his family in the tumultuous social environment. Later, YYK regretfully recollected the period as "a lost decade". However, the brewery business, that he left to his younger brother, Yoo Youngjin, to manage, provided his family basic income through the years when his abstract painting was not a feasible means of making a living at all and allowed him to concentrate in his artwork. All of YYK's art works before the Korean war were destroyed during the war except two and the works exhibited at the 3rd Sinsasil-pa exhibition at Busan in 1953 were later found in deteriorated shapes and subsequently restored.

Pursuing the Abstract Art
When YYK returned to Seoul in 1955 and tried to resume his career as a painter, Korea during this period was close to an isolated country where neither information about world trend in fine art nor basic materials necessary for painting were available. YYK once mentioned that he colored his painting in red because it was the only available color. It was a metaphor that materials shortage of the time was quite severe, but it was also a period of radical polarization. Right after the paranoid of the Korean war, McCarthyism of the society was such that red color in painting was often confused with the support of communism.
After serious thoughts on the future, YYK chose the mountain as the motif of his future work and pursued it in his own way. Artists in general moved to abstract art after experiencing figurative art, but YYK started abstract art from the beginning. He dissected natural image into basic forms and composed certain patterns when no Korean artists actually paid attention to abstraction

Having not expected abstract paintings ever to become a source of income in his lifetime, he was virtually nonchalant to the need of local art market and used to say, "I will study painting up to sixty years old. After that, I will paint whatever I want". In fact, his paintings were sold for the first time when he became sixty years old and that was the moment when the Korean economy started to prosper.

It was only after the 1960s that information on the artistic movement around the world became available through the art books imported from Japan. Becoming more aware of the greater arenas abroad, he participated in the Sao Paulo biennial in 1963 and the Congress for Cultural Freedom Invitational Exhibition in 1964. When Kim Whanki, who immigrated to U.S. the previous year, wrote him that in N.Y. artist work almost mechanically from nine to six at their studios as salary men do at their company, which was a rather admonishing remark on loose work habit and morale of Korean artists at the time, YYK responded that he could do the same at home. In fact, he had been already quite punctual with his painting schedule and put ten hours a day into his work until deteriorating health prevented him from doing so much later. YYK made regular trips, for four or five days about every five weeks, to Uljin to supervise the brewery firm, travelling through mountains of Kangwon-do and along the coastline of the Sea of Japan, and the travel gave him refreshments as well as artistic inspirations. However, extensive work in the standing posture damaged his hip joint, which combined with severe heart attack in 1976 virtually confined him to work sitting on a wheelchair. 

YYK was elected as the representative of Association of Modern Artists in 1961, but he resigned the post not long after to focus on the first solo exhibition scheduled in 1964. In the similar vein, he once held a teaching position at the Hongik university as a chairman of oil painting department (1966-1969), but resigned few years later and never returned to university again. YYK did not regard education as a mission of his life and all in his mind was to concentrate on painting to compensate for the lost decade.

1955–1958: Search in the dark
YYK became a founding member of Modern Art Society (from 1957) and the works made in this period showed several characteristics; complicated yet diverse dimensional composition, thick and strong outlines making rigid but geometrical forms, heavily painted primary colors delivering unique texture. Even though abstraction was the major focus that YYK delved into, semblance to the landscapes of Uljin and Jukbyun could be found in his works.

1958-1967: Absoluteness and freedom
Since 1958, the thick and strong lines disappeared and vivid color phases appeared on the canvas.  The keen strokes often resembled the outbreaks of the Earth's crust and sharp diagonal lines brought dynamics on the canvas. The sharp contrast of colors and density of compositions are the main characteristic of YYK's work. Kim Byungki, the art critic and artist, once mentioned about this characteristic of YYK's work that "the energy, like when lava explodes from the crate, bursting out from the painting delivers inexplicable emotions to the viewers." The lines traversing the canvas like flash of light enhance this sensation. Lee Il, the critic, wrote that the balance and harmony of colors in paintings suggested that YYK's usage of color reached a certain level of mastery, and Kim Youngjoo also depicted that his works carried the essence of our era. Compared to the previous works portraying the nature with strict composition, the works in this period deliver tensions with dynamics and motional senses freed from any rules that YYK explored in the previous era.

1968–1973: Geometric abstraction
In his 50s, YYK started to explore geometrical forms and primary colors. The thick and rough texture of the paints of the previous era disappeared and over all the calmness and stability were brought to the canvases. Primary and complementary colors were used to escalate the visual sensation, and lines intersecting the spaces diagonally, vertically, and horizontally imparted a sense of dynamism to the canvas where essential figurative elements of natural objects were extracted in their simplest forms and repeatedly duplicated to provide depth and perspective to the painting. Shades of the sunlight and spatial composition drawn as straight lines or main figures appearing as negative exposition inside the primary color field were typical characteristics of YYK's work of this period

1973–1979: Pastoral color fields
In 1977, YYK moved from Yaksu-dong where he lived for thirty years to Deungchon-dong, which was an outskirts of Seoul. The newly built house was very quiet and surrounded by a little hill at the back with many trees, and through the windows of the atelier he could see pheasants coming to rest in his backyard. Works belonging to this period were painted in gentler colors using softer lines, which provided intimacy and comfort rather than tension and rigor, compared to those made in previous years. Trees were often depicted as ‘Y’ shapes and mountains showed softer and rounder angles.

1978–1999: Peace and comfort
In his later years, YYK suffered from many kinds of illnesses. He used to be hospitalized for months at a time; for myocardial infarction (1976), thighbone fracture (1979), heart surgery(1983), hip joint surgery(1984), several strokes and so on. Even though deteriorating health severely limited his activities, YYK remained serene and sharp to the end. Almost defiantly, YYK refused to rest and said in an interview, "Now that I am getting old, I need more enthusiasms and stimuli to continue. When I stare at my paintings, I feel passionate tension, which fills me with some ardor and enthusiasm. I will train myself and paint with this kind of passion and enthusiasm to the end." In his final days, he could work less than few hours a day on a wheelchair. The works created around this time, when he lived in Deungchon-dong and Bangbae-dong, bring the sense of tenderness and comfort because they are painted in pure colors and figures are presented in softer and gentler way more than ever. The screen has been flattened and the basic patterns; such as circles, triangles, and rectangles depicting sky, mountain, Sun, trees, etc. are repeated to deliver joy and delights of life.

Death
Even though YYK suffered quite severely from health problems after he became sixty years old, his work of this period remain in peace. That is more in conformity with the nature of YYK. In many occasions that could lead him to death, he was always calm and quiet. Kim Kisoon, his wife, recalled that YYK lived a life of his own and pursued his own way of living without clinging to longevity or reputation. He used to say, "I became a painter to live a free life not interfered by others. Why should I worry now?" YYK died on November 11, 2002, and the epitaph inscribed on his tombstone says, "the mountain stays in my mind." YYK was a true pioneer in Korean abstract painting and modern art in general who insisted on absoluteness and freedom through the most turbulent years of modern history.

References

Footnotes

Sources
 Kim, Gwang-wu, "Abstracting Landscape: The Formativeness in Yoo Youngkuk's work", The Professor's Times, December 1, 2003.
 Lee, Inbum, "Neo Realism Group – The First Pure Painterly Artist Group", (Art Culture, 2008). 
 Oh, Gwangsu, "Abstract Shape and Color Field Composition: The Art World of Yoo Youngkuk", in Yoo Youngkuk 10th Anniversary Exhibition Catalogue, (Paju: Maronie Books, 2012).
 Oh, Gwangsu, Yoo Youngkuk, the pioneer of Korean Abstract Art – His Life and Prospect, (Paju: Maronie Books, 2012).
 Park, Chun-nam, Yoo Youngkuk Solo Exhibition Catalogue, (Hoam Art Gallery, 1996

External links

1916 births
2002 deaths
Korean artists